No Show Without Punch is a mini-album released in the United Kingdom by Australian rock band Weddings Parties Anything.  It was released in 1989 on Billy Bragg's Utility label on both vinyl and CD. The mini-album comprises material from the band's 1987 debut album, Scorn of the Women, and the 1988 EP, Goat Dancing on the Tables. This was the band's only release on this label.

Track listing

Personnel 
 Weddings Party Anything 
 Peter Lawler — bass 
 Marcus Schintler — drums, vocals  
 Dave Steel — guitar 
 Mick Thomas — guitar, vocals 
 Mark Wallace — accordion, vocals

 Additional musicians 
 George Danglin — piano (track 6) 
 Janine Hall — bass (track 3 & 5)
 Michael Barclay — background vocals (track 5)
 Jeff Raglus — trumpet (track 7)

 Recording details 
 Alan Thorne — producer (tracks 1, 2, 3, 5 & 7) 
 Weddings, Parties, Anything — producer (tracks 1, 2, 3, 5 & 7)

References 

1990 albums
Weddings Parties Anything albums